The Chrysler minivans are a series of minivans that have been produced and marketed by the American automaker Chrysler since the 1984 model year.  Currently in its sixth generation, the model line is marketed worldwide, primarily in North America and Europe.  Introduced as the Dodge Caravan and Plymouth Voyager, the Chrysler minivans have been marketed under a variety of nameplates under the Chrysler, Plymouth, Dodge, and Ram brands; through the use of rebadging, the model line has also been marketed under the Lancia and Volkswagen brands.

The introduction of the Chrysler minivans popularized the body styles by automakers in North America, leading to the introduction of competitive vehicles such as the Chevrolet Astro/GMC Safari, Ford Aerostar, Toyota Previa, and Mazda MPV.  During the 1990s, the popularity of the model line led to its form factor becoming closely adopted by many of its competitors, leading to the Ford Windstar/Freestar, Honda Odyssey, Toyota Sienna, Kia Sedona, and Nissan Quest.  

Since 1983, Chrysler has manufactured minivans at its Windsor Assembly facility (Windsor, Ontario, Canada).  From 1987 to 2007, the company supplemented production in North America with its Saint Louis Assembly facility (Fenton, Missouri).  For the European market, exports were largely supplemented by the Eurostar joint-venture factory in Graz, Austria from 1992 to 2002.  The highest-selling line of minivans worldwide, Chrysler produced the 15 millionth example of the model line in 2019.

Table of models

First generation (1984–1990)

The first-generation Chrysler minivans were released in November 1983 as 1984 models.  The Dodge Caravan was an all-new nameplate, with the Plymouth Voyager adopted from its previous full-size van line.  The model lines were built on the front-wheel drive Chrysler S platform.  To streamline production and development costs, while the S platform was a distinct design, it shared powertrain commonality with the K platform and its variants; interior components were also shared with other Chrysler vehicles.

For 1987, Chrysler introduced the extended-length Dodge Grand Caravan and Plymouth Grand Voyager, which used a long-wheelbase version of the S platform chassis.  For 1988, the Chrysler Voyager was introduced for European export.  Alongside the passenger van, the model line was sold by Dodge as a cargo van; from 1984 to 1988, it was known as the Dodge Mini Ram Van and as the Dodge (Grand) Caravan C/V from 1989 to 1990.

Chrysler added a minivan to its namesake brand early in the 1990 year, shifting the Chrysler Town & Country from its traditional station wagon usage to a minivan; sold exclusively in a long-wheelbase version, the Town & Country became the highest-trim Chrysler minivan.

Second generation (1991–1995)

The second-generation Chrysler minivans were released for the 1991 model year, returning the Dodge Caravan and Plymouth Voyager, their extended-wheelbase "Grand" versions, and the Chrysler Town & Country.  The minivans were introduced to Mexico, with Chrysler using the Chrysler Grand Voyager/Grand Caravan nameplate.

Designated the Chrysler AS platform (as Chrysler switched to a two-letter platform nomenclature), the second-generation minivans underwent a substantial revision of the body (sharing only the front door and sliding door stampings) and chassis (the front suspension was retuned and the rear suspension was redesigned entirely); powertrain commonality shifted from the K-car sedans towards its larger derivatives.  In a first for the segment, the model line was fitted with a standard driver-side airbag (1991) and optional integrated rear child safety seats (1992).  Following its introduction in its Ford and GM competitors, Chrysler introduced an all-wheel drive system as an option for 1991.

For 1994, the model line underwent a mid-cycle revision.  While the model line was officially classified a light truck by the US government, the minivans were upgraded to meet 1998 federal safety standards for cars, adding side-impact door beams, dual airbags, four-wheel disc brakes, and a redesigned dashboard.  The second-generation minivans are the last versions of the model line to be fitted with a manual transmission in North America and also the final versions fitted with exterior woodgrain trim.

From 1993 to 1995, the Chrysler TEVan was a limited-production electric vehicle based on the Dodge Caravan; sold to fleet buyers, between 56 and 80 were produced.  For 1994, Chrysler offered a CNG (compressed natural gas) version of its minivan; the fuel tank replaced the spare tire well.

ES platform
The ES platform is the European counterpart to the North American AS platform.  Alongside production by Windsor Assembly in Canada, production of export-market minivans began in 1992 in Graz, Austria (in the Eurostar joint venture factory between Chrysler and Steyr-Daimler-Puch).  Alongside the European-market Chrysler Voyager and Grand Voyager, the ES platform serves as the basis for the Dodge Mini Ram Van (a cargo van exclusive to the Netherlands).

Third generation (1996–2000)

The third-generation Chrysler minivans were released in January 1995 for model year 1996.  In a $2.8 billion redesign of the model line (the most expensive design program ever undertaken by Chrysler at the time), the Dodge Caravan, Plymouth Voyager, and Chrysler Town & Country underwent their first complete redesign since their introduction.  The Dodge Caravan (Chrysler Caravan in Mexico) and Plymouth Voyager were both returned in both standard and extended-wheelbase versions; the Chrysler Town & Country was expanded into a full model line, introducing multiple trim levels and a short-wheelbase body.

Designated the Chrysler NS platform, the minivans again used a front-wheel drive chassis (with all-wheel drive as an option).  Nearly four inches taller than its predecessor, the third generation adopted a cab forward configuration, shifting the windshield and dashboard forward.  As a first in an American-market large minivan, a driver-side sliding door (originally intended for the first-generation model line, but deleted to reduce costs) was introduced as an option.  To improve the flexibility of seat removal, the rear seat latches were redesigned, with bench seat latches set on rollers.  To further differentiate each model line, designers styled the Caravan, Voyager, and Town & Country with distinct front fascias and exterior trim; exterior woodgrain trim was retired from all three model lines.  In another change, the hood ornament was deleted (the only Chrysler Pentastar visible to the driver was on the steering wheel).

Replacing the TEVan, the Dodge Caravan EPIC electric vehicle was produced from 1999 to 2000 (taking its name from a 1992 concept car); the EPIC was leased to fleet buyers.

Coinciding with the phaseout of the Plymouth brand, Chrysler introduced a Chrysler-brand Voyager and Grand Voyager for North America for 2000 (sold concurrently alongside its Plymouth namesake).

GS platform
The Chrysler GS platform is the global export counterpart to the North American Chrysler NS platform.  Again sharing design and powertrain commonality with its North American counterpart, the export version of the Chrysler model line was the only version to offer a manual transmission and a 2.5L turbodiesel engine.  In 1996, the Austrian Eurostar factory commenced production of the first right-hand drive Chrysler minivans.

Alongside the Chrysler Voyager and Grand Voyager marketed for European export, Chrysler marketed the renamed Dodge Ram Van in the Netherlands in a cargo-only configuration.

Fourth generation (2001–2007)

Generation IV of the platform was introduced on January 10, 2000, and was called RS.

Models:
 2001–2003 Chrysler Voyager
 2001–2007 Chrysler Town & Country 
 2001–2007 Dodge Caravan/Grand Caravan
 2001–2007 Chrysler Voyager/Grand Voyager (Mexico)

CS

The CS is a variant of the RS platform made specifically for the Chrysler Pacifica crossover SUV.

Model:
 2004–2008 Chrysler Pacifica

RG
The Chrysler RG platform is the global export counterpart to the North American Chrysler RS platform.

Model:
 2001–2007 Chrysler Caravan/Grand Caravan
 2001–2007 Chrysler Voyager/Grand Voyager
 2005-2007 Chrysler Town & Country (Taiwan)
 2001–2007 Dodge/Chrysler Ram Van (Netherlands, cargo van)
 2007–2010 Chrysler Grand Voyager/Dodge Grand Caravan (China)

Fifth generation (2008–2020)

The fifth-generation Chrysler minivans were introduced at the 2007 North American International Auto Show for the 2008 model year, marking the debut of the RT platform. In a major change, the short-wheelbase configuration was dropped, alongside the Chrysler Town & Country, all Dodge minivans were now Grand Caravans. The export-market Chrysler Grand Voyager made its return; following the acquisition of Chrysler by Fiat, the model line was also marketed as a Lancia Voyager outside North America. Unlike the preceding and succeeding generations, the fifth generation minivans were not marketed under the Chrysler Grand Caravan nameplate. It was also the only generation of the Dodge Grand Caravan to be marketed in Mexico.

The first Chrysler minivans to be powered exclusively by V6 engines (in North America), the RT platform marked the introduction of a 4.0 L SOHC V6 and a 6-speed automatic transmission. For 2011, the 3.6 L Pentastar V6 replaced all three V6 engines, remaining the sole V6 engine through current production. In Europe, the Voyager was powered by a 2.8 L VM Motori inline-4 turbodiesel; for the first time, no manual transmission was offered.

For 2012, the Grand Caravan C/V cargo van shifted its branding, becoming the Ram C/V. In 2015, Ram replaced the C/V with the Ram ProMaster City (a rebadged Fiat Doblo).

Models:
 2008–2016 Chrysler Town & Country 
 2008–2020 Dodge Grand Caravan
 2008–2010 Chrysler Grand Voyager
 2011–2015 Lancia Voyager
 2012–2014 Ram C/V (replaced by Ram ProMaster City)

RM

The Volkswagen Routan was introduced at the 2008 Chicago Auto Show as a rebadged variant of the Chrysler minivans, manufactured at Windsor Assembly using the RT platform, designated as the RM platform. Marketed by Volkswagen exclusively in the North American market, the Routan featured revised interior and exterior styling as well as different equipment content from the Chrysler vans. Production of the Routan was discontinued in 2013.

Model:
 2009–2014 Volkswagen Routan

Discontinuation 
On February 28, 2020, Fiat Chrysler Automobiles announced the discontinuation of the Dodge Grand Caravan, the last RT nameplate in production; production of the minivan was scheduled to conclude in late May but has since been delayed to mid-July.

Sixth generation (2017–present) 

The sixth generation of the Chrysler minivan was introduced at the 2016 North American International Auto Show, as Chrysler released the 2017 Chrysler Pacifica. Serving as a replacement for the Town & Country, the Pacifica revived the nameplate of the 2004–2008 Town & Country-derived CUV. For the first time since their 1984 introduction, Chrysler markets a different minivan than Dodge, with the latter division retaining the previous-generation Grand Caravan; the Chrysler/Lancia Voyager export nameplates were discontinued and all exports are sold as Pacificas.

Sharing the CUSW (Fiat D-Evo) platform with the Chrysler 200, the Pacifica is the first minivan sold in North America sold with a 9-speed automatic transmission; a CVT is part of the first plug-in hybrid powertrain in a minivan, offered as an option.

For the 2020 model year, Chrysler reintroduced the Voyager nameplate (last seen in 2003 for the United States). Adopting the lower two trim levels of the Pacifica, the Voyager also introduces a trim level specifically for fleet sale. The option of all-wheel drive (last seen in 2004) was also reintroduced for the gasoline-only Pacifica during this model year.

For the 2021 model year, Chrysler announced that the lower two trim levels of Pacifica, sold as the Voyager in the United States, will be sold under the Grand Caravan nameplate in Canada. The L and LX trim levels respectively adopt the SE and SXT designations from the outgoing Dodge Grand Caravan. Vehicles bearing the "Chrysler Grand Caravan" nameplate were last seen in 2007, primarily in South American markets.

Models:
 2017–present Chrysler Pacifica/Chrysler Pacifica Hybrid
 2020–present Chrysler Voyager/Chrysler Grand Caravan

See also
 Chrysler platforms
 Minivan

References

 
 Allpar minivans section – Chrysler Corp. minivan history, each generation, and 2008 rumors/spy shots
 Internet forum (in French)  www.minivanchrysler.com
 Van Worth Calculator 

S